Muñogalindo is a municipality located in the province of Ávila, Castile and León, Spain. According to the 2006 census (INE), the municipality has a population of 423 inhabitants.

References

External links
 Muñogalindo en la Red

Municipalities in the Province of Ávila